Helgerson is a Swedish patronymic surname. Notable people with the surname include:

Henry Helgerson (born 1952), American politician
John L. Helgerson, American intelligence official

See also
Helgesen

References

Swedish-language surnames